ALI (acronym for Alien Liberty International) is a multinational hip hop/funk band formed in Shibuya, Tokyo. All members of the band are mixed with roots in Japan, Europe, America, Asia, and Africa. 

ALI released their first single "Wild Side", which was chosen to be the opening theme song for the first season of anime Beastars, and their self-titled debut album, both in 2019. A year later, ALI released their second single "Lost in Paradise" featuring rapper AKLO, used as the ending theme for the anime Jujutsu Kaisen. 

On May 14, 2021, it was announced on the band's official website that activities would be suspended indefinitely due to drummer Kahadio being arrested for fraud.

On November 18, 2021, it was announced that the band had returned, but drummer Kahadio would no longer be part of the group.

On February 23, 2022, the band released the EP "Inglourious Eastern Cowboy". On January 25, 2023 they released their debut album "Music World".

Band members
Current members
 Leo Imamura – vocals (2016–present)
 Luthfi Rizki Kusumah – bass guitar (2016–present)
 Alexander Taiyo Fidel – percussion (2016–present)
 César Aiichiro – guitar (2020–present)
 Jin Inoue – keyboard (2019–present)

Former members
 Jua – rapping (2016–2020)
 Zeru – guitar (2016–2020)
 Kahadio (Kadio Shirai) – drums (2016–2021)
 Yu Hagiwara – saxophone (2017–2021)

Discography

Albums

Mini albums

Singles

Digital singles

Collaboration singles

Music videos

Controversy 
In November 2020, it was announced that the band would perform the opening theme song for the 2021 anime The World Ends with You the Animation with "Teenage City Riot". On April 4, 2021, however, it was announced that the opening song would be changed due to drummer Kahadio being arrested for participating in a refund scam. On April 23, 2021, Kahadio was arrested again for a separate fraud case. Kahadio and his friends were offering an elderly woman a refund for medical expenses in exchange of transferring her money to an account. He then withdrew half of the money from the same account. Due to the controversy, the band went on indefinite hiatus on May 14, 2021, as well as pulling most of their songs off streaming platforms.They returned from hiatus, and their music was restored on November 18.

Awards and nominations

References

External links
 

2016 establishments in Japan
Japanese funk musical groups
Japanese hip hop groups
Musical groups established in 2016
Musical groups from Shibuya
Crunchyroll Anime Awards winners